Brzostow may refer to:
Brzostów, west Poland
Brzóstów, central Poland